Mónica Equihua Solórzano (born 23 September 1982 in Tancítaro, Michoacán) is a Mexican race walker. At the age of 26 years, she switched from middle-distance running to racewalking.  She competed in the 20 km kilometres event at the 2012 Summer Olympics.

Personal bests

Achievements

References

External links

Sports reference biography

Mexican female racewalkers
1982 births
Living people
Olympic athletes of Mexico
Athletes (track and field) at the 2012 Summer Olympics
Sportspeople from Michoacán
World Athletics Championships athletes for Mexico
Pan American Games competitors for Mexico
Athletes (track and field) at the 2011 Pan American Games
21st-century Mexican women
20th-century Mexican women